Oedera is a genus of African flowering plants in the tribe Gnaphalieae within the family Asteraceae. The genus is named in honor of the Danish botanist Georg Christian Oeder.

The species have yellow central and ray florets in their flower-heads. Their seeds all have a little crown of scales, and the leaves are often fragrant and unpalatable for stock grazing. 

 Species
Species accepted by the Plants of the World Online as of December 2022:

 formerly included
see Flaveria Heterolepis Hirpicium 
 Oedera aliena L.f. - Heterolepis aliena (L.f.) Druce
 Oedera alienata Thunb. - Hirpicium alienatum (Thunb.) Druce
 Oedera trinervia Spreng. - Flaveria trinervia (Spreng.) C.Mohr

References

 
Flora of Africa
Asteraceae genera